Johan Arthur Castrén  (10 June 1866 – 29 June 1946) was a Finnish politician, born in Turtola. He was a member of the Senate of Finland and the first director of internal affairs from 27 November 1917 to 27 November 1918, before the Ministry of Interior was created. He served as Mayor of Helsinki from 1931 to 1936. He died in Jakobstad.

References

1866 births
1946 deaths
People from Pello
People from Oulu Province (Grand Duchy of Finland)
Young Finnish Party politicians
Finnish senators
Members of the Diet of Finland
Members of the Parliament of Finland (1909–10)
Members of the Parliament of Finland (1910–11)
Members of the Parliament of Finland (1911–13)
Mayors of Helsinki
People of the Finnish Civil War (White side)
Ministers of the Interior of Finland